Downtown Music Gallery is a long-running, internationally-known record store, mail-order, and performance space located in New York City. It specializes in "Downtown Music", a recognized catchphrase for avant-garde jazz and contemporary composition, experimental, and improvisational music from around the world. It was founded in 1991, by David Yamner, Stephen Popkin and Bruce Lee Gallanter.

"Downtown Music Gallery, one of the few great record stores left in Manhattan and which was founded by Mr. Popkin, Mr. Yamner and myself 23 years ago in May of 1991". Originally at 211 East 5th street for the first ten years of its existence, followed by seven years at 342 Bowery. It is currently located in Two Bridges, Manhattan, at 13 Monroe St. Bruce Lee Gallanter, the co-founder,  and  Emanuel 'MannyLunch' Maris, formerly the owner of Lunch For Your Ears, run the shop.

The store also devotes an entire 700-CD display to John Zorn's Tzadik label, as it also operates the mail-fulfillment for the label. DMG features in-store live performances for free every Sunday night, and on other nights for special occasions. DMG also provides the telephone information service for The Stone performance space, founded 2005.

References

External links
Downtown Music Gallery official site

Music venues in Manhattan